Epic Win is a British game show that aired on BBC One from 20 August to 24 September 2011 and was hosted by Alexander Armstrong.

Format
In the programme, contestants complete individual challenges such as trying to dress whilst bouncing a football or cycling whilst trying to inflate hot water bottles. Those who complete their challenge win the Epic Win trophy and go to the "Epic Centre" to have the opportunity to win between £3 and £3,000, depending on what the celebrity panelists think this is worth.  Those who fail a challenge have to exit through the "fail door".

When playing for the cash, the panel members each note down an amount between £1 and £1,000 depending on how impressed they are with somebody's skill. Successful contestants can then potentially win an amount up to the total that the panellists pledged. The contestant is then given a sequence of increasing amounts, with the option to stop at any time by pressing the red button.  If the last amount announced before the button was pressed is equal to or lower than the panel's total, they win the cash (and Joe Lycett announces "EPIC WIN!").  If the contestant's total is higher than the panel's total, Joe Lycett announces "zero pounds" and they leave with nothing but the trophy and go through the fail door.

Celebrity guests

References

External links

2010s British game shows
2011 British television series debuts
2011 British television series endings
BBC television comedy
BBC television game shows